Kozluk District is a district of Batman Province in Turkey. Its seat is the town Kozluk. Its area is 1,101 km2, and the district had a population of 60,953 in 2021.

Composition
There are two municipalities in Kozluk District:
 Bekirhan
 Kozluk

There are 69 villages in Kozluk District:

 Akçakışla
 Akçalı
 Alıçlı
 Arıkaya
 Armutlu
 Aşağıkıratlı
 Beşkonak
 Beybağı
 Bölükkonak
 Çamlıca
 Çaygeçit
 Çayhan
 Çayönü
 Çevrecik
 Danagöze
 Dereköy
 Derince
 Dövecik
 Duygulu
 Eskice
 Geçitaltı
 Geyikli
 Güllüce
 Gümüşörgü
 Gündüzlü
 Günyayla
 Gürpınar
 İnişli
 Kahveci
 Kaletepe
 Kamışlı
 Karaoğlak
 Karpuzlu
 Karşıyaka
 Kavakdibi
 Kayadibi
 Kıratlı
 Koçaklı
 Kolludere
 Konaklı
 Kumlupınar
 Örensu
 Ortaca
 Oyuktaş
 Parmakkapı
 Pınarhisar
 Samanyolu
 Seyitler
 Seyrantepe
 Taşlıdere
 Taşlık
 Tosunpınar
 Tuzlagözü
 Ulaşlı
 Uzunçayır
 Uzunyazı
 Ünsaldı
 Yanıkkaya
 Yankılı
 Yapaklı
 Yayalar
 Yazılı
 Yazpınar
 Yedibölük
 Yeniçağlar
 Yenidoğan
 Yenidoğan Ase
 Yıldızlı
 Ziyaret

The district encompasses 115 hamlets.

References 

Districts of Batman Province